911 (pronounced "nine one one") are an English pop group consisting of Lee Brennan, Jimmy Constable and Simon "Spike" Dawbarn. They were formed in London in 1995 and released their debut single "Night to Remember" in May 1996. This was followed by their debut album The Journey in March 1997, which was certified Gold by the BPI in November 1997. 911 released two more Silver-certified albums, Moving On and There It Is, in 1998 and 1999, respectively. There It Is also produced their only UK number-one single, a cover of "A Little Bit More", which topped the UK Singles Chart in January 1999.

In their five years together, 911 scored ten UK top 10 singles. They sold 10 million singles and 6 million albums around the world, and were very popular in South East Asia, where their first two albums went to number one. They split in late 1999.

In October 2012, it was announced that 911 would again reunite for the ITV2 reality-documentary series The Big Reunion, along with Atomic Kitten, Liberty X, B*Witched, Five and Honeyz in January 2013. Due to the highly positive reception, the groups went on an arena tour around the UK and Ireland. Their comeback album Illuminate... (The Hits and More) was released on 8 September 2013, along with their comeback single "2 Hearts 1 Love". In early 2014, 911 headlined their own UK tour - The Illuminate: The Hits and More Tour.

Career

1995: Formation
Dancers Jimmy Constable and Simon "Spike" Dawbarn were introduced to each other in the early 1990s by another dancer called Clive. Before long, Constable and Dawbarn were both chosen to work as dancers on the late-night ITV music show The Hit Man and Her. In 1995, after seeing how successful Jason Orange, who used to be a dancer on the show, had been with boy band Take That (and having also become more popular than the acts they were dancing for), Constable and Dawbarn decided to put their own group together. At Carlisle's radio station CFM Radio, they found Steve Gilmour, who had previously managed PJ & Duncan and Boyzone, and asked him to be their manager a few months later. Gilmour initially turned them down, but Constable and Dawbarn continued to gain more and more fans as time went on. Every time their paths crossed, Constable would show Gilmour the fanmail they were receiving and they were also one of the seven acts to be booked at the Sands Centre in Carlisle, again for CFM.

Gilmour had finally become convinced and he decided to manage them but they were short of a singer. Lee Brennan, who had been a fan of Dawbarn and Constable on The Hit Man and Her, was recruited following a recommendation by Gilmour. After moving into Gilmour's three-bedroom flat in the south side of Glasgow, 911 embarked on a massive tour of schools and under-18 clubs all over the UK in order to build up their growing army of teenage followers, and fast became crowd favourites on road shows during the Summer of 1995. Despite their immense popularity, they were turned down by every record company they turned to. After being unable to secure a major record deal, 911 and their management team Backlash decided to form their own record label, Ginga Records, with funding from businessman Frank Shapiro.

1996–1999: Success
In April 1996, they released their debut single, a cover of Shalamar's "Night to Remember", and it entered the UK Singles Chart at number 38. In July, their second single "Love Sensation", which was later featured in the 1997 live-action film Casper: A Spirited Beginning, charted even higher at number 21. The success of these two independently released singles created a major record label bidding war and in September 1996, 911 were signed up by Richard Branson's Virgin Records on a £3.5 million, four-album deal. 911 won GMTV's 'Search for the Next Big Thing' and were voted the 'Second Best Newcomer' after the Spice Girls in Smash Hits.

911 had their first top 10 hit in 1996 with "Don't Make Me Wait", which reached number 10. Nine more successive UK top 10 hits followed, including "Bodyshakin'" (which became their signature song); "Private Number" and the UK chart-topper "A Little Bit More". During this time, 911 released three studio albums, The Journey (1997), Moving On (1998) and There It Is (1999), all of which hit the top 20 on the UK Albums Chart. They also sold out 35 theatre dates in just 30 minutes for their first headline tour. In Malaysia, The Journey was number one for 20 weeks and every one of their singles was number one as well.

However, after a gruelling schedule the band began to fall apart, with Constable descending into alcoholism (on one occasion appearing on SMTV Live drunk), Dawbarn beginning to suffer agoraphobia and Brennan, being the pin-up and lead singer of the band, began to feel more and more insecure about his image and looks. At the end of 1999, they released a greatest hits album, The Greatest Hits and a Little Bit More, which included (at the time) their final single "Wonderland" and the group split up. On The Big Reunion, Dawbarn said: "We knew we'd reached our peak and we were kind of that little decline and we thought, 'It's best getting out at the top.'" Constable was also told by the other two that he would be the one to break the news of their break-up live on Chris Moyles' Radio 1 show. In a 2005 interview with The Guardian, Constable said: "I didn't have any time to get my head around it. I had a lump in my throat saying it, then we came out of Radio 1 and the other two guys went to the pub. I got in my car and took off and I never saw them for two years."

2008: First reunion
In 2008, 911 reformed for a nightclub tour of the UK and Republic of Ireland, performing their most popular hits, and have also performed at a number of nightclub and university events, and they entertained the crowd prior to the Bradford Bulls clash with Leeds Rhinos on 23 May 2008. They took part in Living's Pop Goes the Band; where they came together to get back to their boy band ways, resulting in a live performance of "Bodyshakin'".

2012: Second reunion
911 reunited in 2012, along with Atomic Kitten, Liberty X, B*Witched, Five and Honeyz, for the ITV2 documentary series The Big Reunion, a show which would feature the bands reuniting for the first time in several years and undergoing two weeks of intense rehearsals ahead of a comeback performance sometime in 2013. The show began airing on 31 January 2013, and the second episode, which aired on 7 February, featured Lee, Jimmy and Spike talking about their time together and the difficulties that came with being in a band.

The six bands performed a sold-out comeback concert at London's Hammersmith Apollo on 26 February 2013. However, following the high demand for tickets for the gig and The Big Reunion pulling in record ratings for ITV2, it was announced that a UK arena tour would be taking place from 3–14 May 2013. Two more dates were later added for 16 and 17 May, taking the tour total to 14 shows. Due to the arena tour quickly selling out as well, it was announced that the bands from the show will also be going on a mini-Christmas party tour in December 2013.

On 6 March, 911 made an appearance on Daybreak, where they announced that they had recorded a more up-to-date version of "Bodyshakin'" and were also planning to release new material. On 28 March, they appeared on This Morning and confirmed that they would definitely be releasing a new album and touring in 2014. Brennan said: "We're doing a new album, we're going to be touring ourselves next year, so we've got lots of things to look forward to. Bring It On!". During The Big Reunion arena tour, it was announced that the band's new album would be called Illuminate. On 3 August, Brennan tweeted that the album, Illuminate... (The Hits and More), would be released on 9 September 2013 alongside their comeback single "2 Hearts 1 Love". During another appearance on This Morning on 5 August, 911 spoke about their music comeback and also performed "2 Hearts 1 Love".

On 20 March 2014, it was announced that 911 and the other boy bands from both the first and second series of The Big Reunion, Five, Blue, 3T, A1, Damage and 5th Story, would go on a nationwide tour in October 2014.

2019–present: 911 The Reunion and Đức Phúc collaboration 
On 22 June 2019, 911 made a comeback to South East Asia with their concert known as 911 The Reunion in Kuala Lumpur, Malaysia with a sold-out show.

On 9 February 2023, the group collaborated on a music video for the first time with foreign singer Đức Phúc, a young male singer from Vietnam. The song is officially called "I do" (Vietnamese: Em đồng ý) with two versions in English and bilingual in English and Vietnamese.

Discography

 The Journey (1997)
 Moving On (1998)
 There It Is (1999)
 Illuminate... (The Hits and More) (2013)

References

 
Musical groups established in 1995
Musical groups disestablished in 2000
Musical groups reestablished in 2005
Musical groups disestablished in 2005
Musical groups reestablished in 2012
English boy bands
British musical trios
Teen pop groups
Vocal trios
Musical groups from London